Birger Bloch Peitersen (born 7 March 1945) is a Danish former football manager and player. After his career in football, he featured as a sports pundit. He is currently employed at the Department of Sports at the University of Copenhagen.

Career
After playing as a midfielder for IK Skovbakken and Helsingør IF, Peitersen graduated in Sports and History degrees at the University of Copenhagen in 1972. He then went on to become a sports consultant in Zambia for the Danish International Development Agency (DANIDA). In 1975, Peitersen became employed as a gymnasie (high school) teacher at Rungsted Gymnasium, before joining the UCPH Department of Nutrition, Exercise and Sports in 1981.

As a player, Peitersen made appearances for Skovbakken in the 2nd Division (third-tier). In 1978, he started his career in management as the head coach of Helsingør IF, a position he held until starting at the UCPH Department of Nutrition, Exercise and Sports. From 1985 until 1988, he was the coach of the Denmark women's national football team. In 1987, he shortly coached Brøndby IF after the departure of Ebbe Skovdahl to Benfica, where he led the team to the Danish championship in the same year. He worked as Brøndby's head coach alongside his position as women's national team coach, but stopped in Brøndby when Skovdahl returned to his former position in the following year.

Since 1984, Peitersen has been a pundit on several Danish television channels, including DR, TV3 and Kanal 5. He retired from punditry in 2010.

Honours
Brøndby
1st Division(): 1987

References

1945 births
Living people
Danish men's footballers
FC Helsingør players
Danish football managers
Brøndby IF managers
Denmark women's national football team managers
Danish Superliga managers
VSK Aarhus players
Footballers from Aarhus
Association football midfielders